András Tasnádi Nagy (29 January 1882 – 1 July 1956) was a Hungarian politician and jurist, who served as Minister of Justice between 1938 and 1939.

Life 
He finished law studies at the Faculty of Law of the University of Budapest. He worked as a lawyer from 1908. He worked for the Hungarian Railways as counsel between 1910 and 1925, and as attorney general until 1926. He became administrative state secretary of the Ministry of Justice in 1933 later he served in the Ministry of Religion and Education. Tasnádi Nagy was elected to the Diet of Hungary in the colours of the governing Party of National Unity in 1935. He regained his seat in 1939. He was appointed justice minister in the Béla Imrédy cabinet.

He served as Speaker of the House of Representatives from 1 November 1939 to 29 March 1945. He also held his position after the Arrow Cross Party's coup. He became a leading member of the National Alliance of Lawmakers which was established by the Nazi-dominated puppet government. As a result of this after the Second World War Tasnádi Nagy was arrested and sentenced to life imprisonment by the People's Tribunal in Budapest. The first judgement was death, but Zoltán Tildy, the President of Hungary provided grace, so it was changed. Tasnádi Nagy died in captivity.

References
 Magyar Életrajzi Lexikon

1882 births
1956 deaths
Politicians from Budapest
People from the Kingdom of Hungary
Hungarian Calvinist and Reformed Christians
Unity Party (Hungary) politicians
Justice ministers of Hungary
Speakers of the House of Representatives of Hungary
20th-century Hungarian lawyers
Eötvös Loránd University alumni
Hungarian collaborators with Nazi Germany
Hungarian politicians convicted of crimes
Hungarian people convicted of war crimes
Hungarian prisoners sentenced to death
Prisoners sentenced to death by Hungary
Hungarian people who died in prison custody
Prisoners who died in Hungarian detention